Who's Your Daddy? is an American reality television special broadcast by the Fox Broadcasting Company (Fox). The 90 minute special premiered on January 3, 2005, and it was hosted by English actor Finola Hughes. The special depicted eight men in competition for a $100,000 reward over who could best convince TJ Myers, a woman who was adopted, that they were her biological father. One of the contestants, however, actually was Myers's biological father. Myers had the opportunity to interview and observe each contestant before making a determination on which man was her biological father. If Myers incorrectly selected a contestant as her biological father, the contestant won the reward. Conversely, if she correctly determined which contestant was her biological father, Myers won the reward.

The special was intended to serve as a pilot for a six-episode season, although Fox shelved the remaining episodes following the special's modest ratings.

Format
The special's premise was that an adult who had been put up for adoption as an infant was placed in a room with 25 men, one of whom was their biological father. If the contestant could correctly pick out who was their father, the contestant would win $100,000. If they chose incorrectly, the person that they incorrectly selected would get the $100,000, although the contestant would still be reunited with his or her father. The first adoption contestant was actress T. J. Myers. United Press International reported that Myers "guessed which of eight men was her father. She guessed correctly and won $100,000."

Announcement
On December 14, 2004, Fox sent out a press release for Who's Your Daddy? Set to air on January 3, 2005, the release described the special as a "dramatic and emotional" program.

Reception
Who's Your Daddy? garnered mixed reception from television critics. The special resulted in a grassroots campaign among adoptive parents and protests from national adoption organizations. The special drew controversy from adoption rights organizations, leading to one Fox affiliate (WRAZ in Raleigh, North Carolina) declining to air the series pilot, a 90-minute special. Who's Your Daddy? garnered further controversy when, one day after the special's premiere, Gawker reported that Myers had previously appeared in the 1995 softcore pornography film Seduction of Innocence.

Paul Farhi of The Washington Post referred to Who's Your Daddy? as a "new-low-in-reality-television 'special'", in which he directed his criticisms at the special's title. Alessandra Stanley of The New York Times claimed that despite the special's "provocative title, [Who's Your Daddy?] turned out to be fairly bland and hokey -- a daytime soap opera shown at night."

Ratings
The special premiered to 6.3 million viewers, in which it was fourth in its time slot according to Nielsen Media Research. The special had a 2.3/6 rating among adults 18-49.

Cancellation
After the pilot finished fourth in the Nielsen ratings for its time slot, Fox decided not to broadcast the other five episodes that had been produced. However, the pilot aired as a 'special' and not as a 'series premiere' so technically the series was canceled before airing an episode.

References

External links
 

2000s American reality television series
2005 television specials
Fox Broadcasting Company original programming
Fox television specials
Television controversies in the United States
Unaired television shows
Works about adoption